The High School at Moorpark College is a middle college located on the campus of Moorpark College in Moorpark, California, United States. It was founded with a grant  from the California Community College Chancellor's Office in February 2000, The High School at Moorpark College is a partnership between Moorpark College and Moorpark Unified School District.

External links 
 

Moorpark College
High schools in Ventura County, California
Public high schools in California
Moorpark, California
2000 establishments in California
Educational institutions established in 2000